Neil Honey (born 4 April 1963) is an Australian former athlete who specialised in pole vault.

Honey, a native of Melbourne, attended both Parade College and Keon Park Technical School.

Active in the 1980s, Honey was a three-time national champion in pole vault and had a personal best of 5.35m. He placed sixth in the pole vault at the 1985 IAAF World Cup, won bronze at the 1986 Commonwealth Games and was fourth at the 1990 Commonwealth Games.

Honey, younger brother of long jumper Gary, married Australian netball representative Di Atkinson. One of their daughters Taylor plays netball for the Melbourne Vixens and their son Josh is an AFL player for Carlton.

References

External links
Neil Honey at World Athletics

1963 births
Living people
Australian male pole vaulters
Athletes from Melbourne
People educated at Parade College
Commonwealth Games bronze medallists for Australia
Commonwealth Games medallists in athletics
Athletes (track and field) at the 1986 Commonwealth Games
Medallists at the 1986 Commonwealth Games